Molipteryx hardwickii is a species of squash bugs belonging to the subfamily Coreinae.

Distribution

This species is present in India and Nepal.

References

Insects of India
Insects of Nepal
Insects described in 1839
Mictini